Dudley Charles Carew (3 July 1903 – 22 March 1981) was an English journalist, writer, poet and film critic.

Life and career
Carew was educated at Lancing College, where he was the best friend of Evelyn Waugh. Later in life, Waugh spurned Carew, but in spite of this Carew continued to be Waugh's loyal supporter, including denying the allegations of youthful homosexuality that had been made against him.

In 1928 he married Anthea Gamble. The marriage was not a success, and they divorced just five years later.

He was a special correspondent of The Times in the 1920s and 1930s, and reported on cricket matches for the paper. From 1945 until his retirement in 1963 he was the paper's film critic, and also wrote book reviews and amusing fourth leaders. Almost all his articles for The Times were written anonymously, as was the paper's policy until William Rees-Mogg became its editor in 1967.

John Arlott wrote of him:
It was, perhaps, unfortunate for Dudley Carew that his entry into cricket writing should have coincided with the rise of Neville Cardus. If there had never been a Cardus, how highly should we have ranked one who wrote: "At the other end Gunn batted much as a man potters about a garden, digging his fork into a bed with an abstracted and absent-minded air..."

Arlott also rated highly Carew's cricket novel, Son of Grief, saying: "It has its darknesses, but it is convincing, and its characters are rounded and credible." The title, as with another of Carew's cricket books, was taken from the poetry of A. E. Housman. Housman's A Shropshire Lad contains the lines:

  Now in Maytime to the wicket 
  Out I march with bat and pad:  
  See the son of grief at cricket  
  Trying to be glad.

Some of Carew's own poetry appeared in Selections from Modern Poets, two anthologies compiled by J. C. Squire and published in 1921 and 1924.

Carew died in March 1981 at Cuckfield, Sussex, aged 77.

Bibliography 
The Next Corner, John Lane, 1924.
Tuesday, Wednesday, Thursday, Maurice Frank, 1926.
England Over: A Cricket Book, Martin Secker, 1927.
The Courteous Revelation, John Lane, 1927.
Son of Grief, Arthur Barker, 1936.
To The Wicket, Chapman & Hall Ltd, 1947.
The Taken Town, Charles Scribner's Sons, New York, 1947.
The Puppet's Part, Home & Van Thal, 1948.
The House is Gone: A Personal Retrospect, Robert Hale, 1949.
A Fragment of Friendship: A Memory of Evelyn Waugh When Young, Everest Books, 1974, .

Notes

References 
Obituary in Wisden Cricketers' Almanack, 1982 edition.
Arlott on Cricket, edited by David Rayvern Allen, Fontana/Collins, 1985 edition, pp186–188.

External links 

Dustjacket blurb from To the Wicket 
More Mighty than the Bat, the Pen: Culture, Hegemony and the Literaturisation of Cricket
Gideon Haigh on the cricket novels of Dudley Carew and Bruce Hamilton at Cricinfo

1903 births
1981 deaths
Cricket historians and writers
The Times people
English male journalists
English film critics
People educated at Lancing College
20th-century English poets
English male poets
20th-century English novelists
20th-century English male writers